The 2009 American Indoor Football Association season is the league's fifth overall season.  The regular season began on Saturday, March 7 and ended on Monday, July 7.  The league champion was decided on Sunday, July 26 as the Reading Express won AIFA Championship Bowl III. Prior to the regular season, the league held an exhibition game in Harrisburg, Pennsylvania called the AIFA Kickoff Classic.

AIFA Kickoff Classic

Located at the Pennsylvania Farm Show Complex & Expo Center in Harrisburg, Pennsylvania on Saturday, January 24

Standings

 Green indicates clinched playoff berth
 Purple indicates division champion
 Grey indicates best league record

Playoffs

Located at the Casper Events Center in Casper, Wyoming on Sunday, July 26, 2009.

References

External links
 2009 AIFA Stats
 AIFA All-Pro Team

American Indoor Football Association seasons
American Indoor Football Association Season, 2009